The Olympicks is an American hip-hop record production and songwriting group that was formed in 2009, and is currently composed of members J-Fab and Knoxville. The group originated in Detroit, Michigan and have been involved in the production of various projects within the hip-hop music industry, including Lil Wayne's I Am Not a Human Being, Rick Ross' Teflon Don, Triple C's Custom Cars & Cycles, DJ Khaled's Kiss The Ring, and Big Sean's Detroit mixtape.

History
In the mid-2000s, each member of the collective had established himself as part of Michigan’s independent music scene. Knoxville and J-Fab gained national recognition following the success of Jim Jones’ Summer Wit’ Miami - produced by Knoxville. J-Fab was selected to produce on former Shady Records artist Stat Quo's debut album, Statlanta.

The goal of The Olympicks’ partnership was to create a “one-stop shop” that could cater to the production needs of any artist or project based on the different qualities of each member. Knoxville is considered to be the team’s “crate-digger,” and produces a sound which tends to incorporate soul samples and breakbeats. J-Fab’s production technique also makes heavy utilization of record samples, but uses more pop and techno influences to create various sounds across multiple genres. Finally, Flawless crafts universal R&B/Pop beats that are prevalent in today’s mainstream music.

The Olympicks have worked with both established mainstream artists as well as local and underground artists. The group was involved in Big Sean's early career, as they produced the single, "Bullshittin". They also have a relationship with Rick Ross' Maybach Music Group and recently signed a song production deal with Young Money Entertainment and Cash Money Records. They also produced "Out Of This World" for A$AP Rocky's mixtape, LiveLoveA$AP.

Production discography

2009
 Birdman - Priceless
 14. "MP"

 Triple C's - Custom Cars & Cycles
 07. "Throw It in the Sky"
 11. "Finer Things" (featuring Masspike Miles)
 12. "Chick'n Talk'n" (featuring Mack 10 and Warren G) [produced with The Dream Team]

2010
 Young Jeezy - Trap or Die, Pt. 2: By Any Means Necessary
 10. "Just Saying"
 20. "My Tool" (featuring Baby & Bun B)

 Rick Ross - Teflon Don
 11. "All the Money in the World" (featuring Raphael Saadiq)

 Big Sean - Finally Famous, Vol 3: BIG
 03. "What U Doin' Bullshitting"
 07. "Crazy"

 Lil Wayne - I Am Not a Human Being
 02. "Hold Up" (featuring T-Streets)

 Rocko - Rocko Dinero
 15. "Right Here by Me"

2011
 Jigg - High Grade
 08. "Murda He Wrote"

 P.L. - The Turning Lane
 03. "G-Shit"
 06. "I'm Single" (featuring Jwan)
 07. "Like I'm 'Posed To"
 11. "Poster P."
 12. "On My Way" (featuring Stut)
 14. "Back & Forth"
 17. "Already Won"

 Trouble - Green Light
 13. "Danger Zone" (featuring Scalez)

 A$AP Rocky - Live.Love.A$AP
 16. "Out of This World"

 Freddie Gibbs - Cold Day in Hell
 07. - "Let Em Burn"

 Jim Jones - Vampire Life (We Own the Night)
 08. "Play Your Part" (featuring Chase)

2012
 Raekwon - Unexpected Victory
 10. "This Shit Hard" (featuring Dion Primo and LEP Bogus Boys)

 Trouble - 431 Days
 07. "U Don't Deserve Dat"

 DJ Khaled - Kiss the Ring
 15. "B-Boyz" (performed by Birdman featuring Mack Maine, Kendrick Lamar, Ace Hood and DJ Khaled)

 Big Sean - Detroit
 13. "Do What I Gotta Do" (featuring Tyga) [produced with Million $ Mano and Rob Kinelski]

 Yo Gotti - CM7: The World is Yours
 09. "Enemy or Friend"
 16. "Buy Out"

 Reese - Reese vs. The World II
 01. "Hi"

2013
 SAYITAINTTONE - 500 Million
 10. "Callin Me" (featuring Front Paije) [produced with PC] 
 12. "500 Million Dollar Man"

 Tyga - Hotel California
 15. "Palm Trees"

 Young Jeezy, Doughboyz Cashout & YG - Boss Ya Life Up Gang, Vol. 1
 12. "Rub Shoulders" (performed by Doughboyz Cashout featuring Doughboy Clay)

 Jim Jones - Vampire Life III
 01. "Rotation" (featuring Mel Matrix)

 Lil Bibby - Free Crack
 15. "See Me Down"

 Icewear Vezzo - The City is Mine
 03. "D Boy Party" (featuring Trick Trick) [produced with Ant Beatz]
 05. "Money Face" (featuring STL Juan)
 15. "The City is Mine (Outro)" (featuring 3D) [produced with Ant Beatz]

2014
 DJ Folk – The Folk Tape: The Ascension
 23. Big Sean - "Thank You"

 Young Money - Rise of an Empire
 09. "Fresher Than Ever" (featuring Gudda Gudda, Jae Millz, Flow, Mack Maine and Birdman)

2015
 Oba Rowland - Found One
 03. "Around"

 Two-9 - B4FRVR
 03. "Verified"

2016
 Icewear Vezzo - Moon Walken
 14. "Nobody" (featuring Kiki Alexandra)

 G. Twilight - My Ghetto Love Stories: Cancer Loves Taurus
 30. "A Whole Lotta Something's Goin' On" (featuring Deli Rowe)

 Seven the General -  Svengali
 09. "Consent Degree"

2017
Future - FUTURE
 20. "Extra Luv" (featuring YG)

Rick Ross - Rather You Than Me
 12. "Triple Platinum" (featuring Scrilla)

 G. Twilight - The Science Behind the Game
 05. "Addicted Dealer"

CyHi the Prynce - No Dope On Sundays
 01. "Amen (Intro)"

 Ras Kass - Year End Closeout
 13. "AmeriKKKan Horror Story, Pt. 1 & 2" (produced with Nottz)

2018
Tee Grizzley - Activated
 14. "Robbin"

 Noveliss - Cerebral Apex
 10. "Thinking Out Loud"

2019
 J. Stone - The Definition of Loyalty
 07. "Mind on a Million" (featuring Curren$y)

 Ras Kass - Soul on Ice 2
 03. "Midnight Sun" (featuring CeeLo Green)

2020
 Curtis Williams - Zip Skylark II: The Wrath of Danco
 01. "On It"
 13. "Fuck Em"

2021
 Lloyd Banks - The Course of the Inevitable
 05. "Death by Design" (co-produced with Motif Alumni)

References 

American hip hop record producers
Record production teams
Musicians from Detroit
Hip hop collectives
Young Money Entertainment artists
Songwriting teams
African-American record producers